Qinglongshan Ditiexiaozhen Station, is a station on Line 7 of the Wuhan Metro. It entered revenue service on December 28, 2018. It is located in Jiangxia District and it is the southern terminus of Line 7.

Station layout

References

Wuhan Metro stations
Line 7, Wuhan Metro
Railway stations in China opened in 2018